Osmundea  pinnatifida is a species of red alga known by the common name pepper dulse.

It is a small seaweed widely found with the tidal zone of moderately sheltered rocky shores around Britain and Europe.  Although technically a red seaweed, it can show a wide range of colouring from yellow-buff to a red so dark as to be almost black.

Description
Osmundea pinnatifida is a small marine alga which grows in tufts with branches to a length of 8 cm from a discoid holdfast which produces of stolons for further support. The fronds are flattened with a medulla of thick cells covered by a cortex of 2 layers. The branches are alternate, flattened and branching in one plane from the sides one or two times. The axes show a small terminal groove at the apex.

Reproduction
The frond bears spermatangial receptacles which release the male gametes on final branchlets. Cystocarps, the cells which surround the gametophyte, grow on the ultimate branches. Tetraspores are formed on the last three orders of branches.

Habitat
Common growing as tufts on rock in rock pools in the lower littoral but never below low tide.

Distribution
Common around Ireland, Great Britain including Shetland and south to Portugal and the Mediterranean.

Uses
It is harvested and dried in Scotland and in the Channel Islands for use as a curry-flavoured spice.

References

External links
AlgaeBase
Marinespecies.org
Marlin.ac.uk

Rhodomelaceae
Spices
Edible seaweeds